Cleve, van Cleve and Van Cleve are surnames. Notable people with the surname include:

Astrid Cleve (1875–1968), Swedish biologist, geologist, chemist and researcher, first woman in Sweden to obtain a doctorate in science
Bastian Clevé (born 1950), German film director
Benjamin Van Cleve (1773–1821), a pioneer settler of Dayton, Ohio
Cecilia Cleve (died 1819), Swedish librarian 
Charlotte Ouisconsin Clark Van Cleve (1819–1907), American women's suffrage advocate and social reformer
Cornelius van Cleve (1520–1567), Netherlandish painter
Halfdan Cleve (1879–1951), Norwegian composer
Hendrick van Cleve III (died 1589), painter and engraver born in Antwerp
Horatio P. Van Cleve (1809–1891), Union general in the American Civil War
James Van Cleve, football player in the United States, only the fourth known professional player
Jan Van Cleef or Cleve (1646–1716), Dutch-born Flemish painter
Jim Van Cleve (born 1978), American musician, songwriter and producer
John Cleve, a pseudonym of Andrew J. Offutt (born 1934), American science fiction writer
Joos van Cleve (c. 1485–1540/41), Flemish painter, father of Cornelius
Marten van Cleve (1520–1570), Flemish painter, brother of Hendrick and probably related to Joos
Per Teodor Cleve (1840–1905), Swedish chemist and geologist
Richard Cleve, Canadian computer scientist
Rudolf Cleve (1919–1997), highly decorated Luftwaffe officer of World War II
Whitney L. Van Cleve (1922–1997), American college football player and coach
Anders Cleve (1937–1985), Finnish writer

See also
Van Cleave (surname)